Redberry juniper is a common name for two closely related junipers and may refer to:

Juniperus coahuilensis
Juniperus pinchotii, native to southwestern North America